Ozama may refer to:

 Ozama, one of the Geographic Regions of the Dominican Republic
 Ozama River, Dominican Republic
 Fortaleza Ozama (Ozama Fortress), at the entrance to Santo Domingo's Ciudad Colonial, Dominican Republic
 , a US Navy naval mine carrier
 , a steamer

See also
 Osama (disambiguation)